John 16 is the sixteenth chapter of the Gospel of John in the New Testament of the Christian Bible. It records Jesus' continued farewell discourse to his disciples, set on the last night before his crucifixion. Three key words in this chapter, ἁμαρτία, δικαιοσύνη, κρίσις (sin, righteousness and judgment) "comprehend the three great steps of advance in spiritual truth among men". Jesus speaks about the work of the Holy Spirit, the joy of the believers and his victory over the world. The book containing this chapter is anonymous, but early Christian tradition uniformly affirmed that John composed this Gospel.

Text 

The original text was written in Koine Greek. This chapter is divided into 33 verses.

Textual witnesses
Some early manuscripts containing the text of this chapter are: 
Papyrus 75 (AD 175–225)
Papyrus 5 (c. 250; extant verses: 14–30)
Papyrus 22 (c. 250)
Codex Vaticanus (325-350)
Codex Sinaiticus (330-360)
Codex Bezae (c. 400)
Codex Alexandrinus (400-440)
Codex Ephraemi Rescriptus (c. 450; extant verses 22–33)
Papyrus 60 (c. 700; extant verses 29–33)

Places
The setting for the discourse in this chapter and the following chapter appears to be in Jerusalem. The precise location is not specified, but John 18:1 states that afterwards, "Jesus left with his disciples and crossed the Kidron Valley".

Purpose
The evangelist's purpose in this section of his gospel is to support the early Church for whom he is writing, to ensure that they do not fall away (hina mē skandalisthēte). Some commentators suggest he is writing for a specific group of believers called the Johannine Community.

Verse 1
All this I have told you so that you will not fall away.

Translations vary widely in the way they treat the opening verse of this chapter:
that ye should not be caused to stumble (American Standard Version)
that ye should not lose faith (21st Century King James Version)
that ye should not be offended. (Geneva Bible)
that you should not be offended (taken unawares and falter, or be caused to stumble and fall away (Amplified Bible)
so that you will not fall away (New International Version)
so that you won't be caught by surprise (Complete Jewish Bible)
to keep you from being afraid (Contemporary English Version)
that you may not be scandalized (Douay–Rheims Bible)
so that you won't lose your faith when you face troubles (Easy-to-Read Version)
to keep you from stumbling (NRSV)
that you may avoid the offenses that are coming (The Voice)
so that your faith may not be shaken (Jerusalem Bible)
so that you may not be tripped (note on 'literal' translation in Jerusalem Bible)
so that you will not turn back (Bible in Worldwide English)

Meyer observes that

Verse 2
New King James Version
They will put you out of the synagogues.

Verse 4
But these things I have told you, that when the time comes, you may remember that I told you of them.
And these things I did not say to you at the beginning, because I was with you.
Lutheran writer Johann Bengel notes that while Jesus had not said these things before, he was previously aware of the hatred which would arise.

Verse 13 
 However, when He, the Spirit of truth, has come, He will guide you into all truth; for He will not speak on His own authority, but whatever He hears He will speak; and He will tell you things to come.
Commentator Henry Alford notes that in the words all truth, "no promise of universal knowledge, nor of infallibility, is hereby conveyed; but a promise to them and us, that the Holy Spirit shall teach and lead us, not as children, under the tutors and governors of legal and imperfect knowledge, but as sons".

Verse 24 

 Until now you have asked nothing in My name. Ask, and you will receive, that your joy may be full.
See also: Matthew 7:7-8 and Luke 11:9-10.

See also 
 Farewell Discourse
 Jerusalem
 Jesus Christ
 Other related Bible parts: John 13, John 14, John 15, John 17

References

External links
 King James Bible - Wikisource
English Translation with Parallel Latin Vulgate
Online Bible at GospelHall.org (ESV, KJV, Darby, American Standard Version, Bible in Basic English)
Multiple bible versions at Bible Gateway (NKJV, NIV, NRSV etc.)

John 16